Šoljanin or Soljanin is a surname. Notable people with the surname include:

Emina Soljanin, American engineer
Mirza Šoljanin (born 1985), Bosnian singer